Royal Air Force Felixstowe, or more simply RAF Felixstowe, is a former Royal Air Force station located  northeast of Harwich, Essex, England and  southeast of Ipswich, Suffolk.

History

Felixstowe was commissioned 5 August 1913 under the command of Captain C. E. Risk, RM as Seaplanes, Felixstowe, followed by Lieutenant C. E. H. Rathborne, RN in 1914 and Lieutenant-Commander John Cyril Porte, RN in 1915. RNAS Felixstowe was created soon after the outbreak of World War I following the formation of the Royal Naval Air Service, 1 July 1914.

On formation of the Royal Air Force 1 April 1918, the unit was renamed the Seaplane Experimental Station, Felixstowe and disbanded in June 1919. 'C', 'D' and 'E' Boat Seaplane Training Flights were all formed on 8 August 1918 and were disbanded during 1919 with no known aircraft operated while at Felixstowe.

Notable members of the RAF were based at Felixstowe, including, among others, Frank Whittle, credited with the invention of the turbojet engine, and T.E. Lawrence, commonly known as Lawrence of Arabia.

RAF Felixstowe closed 21 June 1962.

The following units were posted here:

Current use

The site is now the Port of Felixstowe,  with nothing remaining of the hangars, slipways and jettys.

See also
 List of former Royal Air Force stations

References

Citations

Bibliography

External links
 Sea-Plane Launching Apparatus: Film of a Short S.8/8 Rangoon flying boat demonstrated to the press at RAF Felixstowe.

Royal Air Force stations in Suffolk
World War I airfields
Royal Air Force stations of World War II in the United Kingdom
World War I sites in England